Fanny Bertrand (born 28 December 1976) is a French para table tennis player. She took up table tennis in 2002 as part of her rehabilitation after sustaining a spinal injury in a road accident in 2000. She has won team titles with Marie-Christine Fillou. 

Her grandfather Robert Bertrand founded the eponymous basketball club FRJ Saint Blaise.

References

External links 
 
 

1976 births
Living people
People from Orange, Vaucluse
Sportspeople from Nîmes
Paralympic table tennis players of France
Table tennis players at the 2008 Summer Paralympics
Table tennis players at the 2012 Summer Paralympics
Medalists at the 2008 Summer Paralympics
French female table tennis players
Paralympic medalists in table tennis
Paralympic bronze medalists for France
Sportspeople from Vaucluse
20th-century French women
21st-century French women